Wapel may refer to:

Wapel (Jade), a river of Lower Saxony, Germany, tributary of the Jade
Wapelbach, also called Wapel, a river of North Rhine-Westphalia, Germany, tributary of the Dalke